The Papalote Creek Wind Farm near Taft, Texas in San Patricio County is an array of 196 wind turbines that can produce 380 megawatts (MW) of power, enough to serve approximately 114,000 homes. The wind farm was built and is operated by E.ON Climate and Renewables North America.

Details
The first phase of 109 Vestas 1.65 megawatt turbines came on line in the fall of 2009. The second phase of 87 Siemens 2.3 megawatt turbines came on line in winter 2010. All turbines are approximately 262 feet high and have three blades. The turbines have a maximum speed of 22 rotations per minute.

The majority of the electricity generated is sold to the Lower Colorado River Authority, and to CPS Energy which is owned by the City of San Antonio.

The land for the wind farm is privately owned and leased to E.ON. The lease agreement allows for other uses of the land such as farming and ranching. The wind farm has added more than $500 million in value to the property tax base of San Patricio County and local school districts. Additional turbines may be added to the wind farm in the future.

The wind farm is located about 20 miles from where Hurricane Harvey made landfall on August 25, 2017, and experienced wind speeds of 90 mph, shutting the wind farm down. Downed power lines delayed operation for a few days before the wind farm became operational again.

Electricity production

(*)   partial year of operation

See also 

 Wind power in Texas
 List of wind farms in the United States

References 

E.ON
Energy infrastructure completed in 2009
Energy infrastructure completed in 2010
Wind farms in Texas
Buildings and structures in San Patricio County, Texas